Zhizdra is a town and the administrative center of Zhizdrinsky District in Kaluga Oblast, Russia, located on the Zhizdra River  southwest of Kaluga, the administrative center of the oblast. Population:

History
The Lithuanian tribe Galindai (Goliady in Russian) lived in the Kaluga region for a long time. Therefore, many names of rivers, like that of the Zhizdra river, and settlements in Russia are of Lithuanian origin.

Zhizdra was first mentioned in 1146. Town status was granted to it in 1777.

During World War II, the town was occupied by the German Army from 5 October 1941 to 16 August 1943.

Administrative and municipal status
Within the framework of administrative divisions, Zhizdra serves as the administrative center of Zhizdrinsky District, to which it is directly subordinated. As a municipal division, the town of Zhizdra is incorporated within Zhizdrinsky Municipal District as Zhizdra Urban Settlement.

References

Notes

Sources

External links

Official website of Zhizdra 
Zhizdra Business Directory 

Cities and towns in Kaluga Oblast
Zhizdrinsky Uyezd